The Serie B, currently named Serie BKT for sponsorship reasons, is the second-highest division in the Italian football league system after the Serie A. It has been operating for over ninety years since the 1929–30 season. It had been organized by Lega Calcio until 2010, when the Lega Serie B was created for the 2010–11 season. Common nicknames for the league are campionato cadetto and cadetteria, since cadetto is the Italian name for junior or cadet.

History
A junior football championship was created in Italy in 1904; after seven editions of the major tournament of FIGC. It was called Second Category, and was composed of senior squads of town clubs and by youth teams of city clubs. If the first ones won the championship, they would be promoted to First Category, which consequently improved in size: the first team to reach the honour, was Pro Vercelli in 1907, which even won the scudetto in 1908. FIGC attempted many times to introduce relegations on the contrary, but the reform was really adopted only in 1921 by the secessionist CCI in its Northern League, which consisted of a First Division and a Second Division: the first teams to be relegated were AC Vicenza and FC Inter even if, after the reunion with FIGC, the regulations were changed, and Venezia was demoted instead of the Milanese club. Even if part of the same league, differently from First Division, Second Division was based on local group with proximity criteria.

Only in 1928 was the big reform conceived by FIGC president Leandro Arpinati: after a year, a new second division based on the same national format of the major tournament would be born. Serie B began in 1929 with 18 clubs and continued until World War II, after which it was divided again between the northern and the southern part of the country in the aftermath of the war. The championship became national again in 1948, and for many years in the second half of the 20th century, it was played by 20 clubs. In 2003–04, a single group of 24 teams was formed, the largest in the history of all levels of the Italian championship. After 2004, a 22-team format was introduced together with playoffs.

After Serie A split with Serie B to form Lega Serie A, Lega Serie B was reformed on 7 July 2010. The league signed a new sponsor bwin for 2010–11 and 2011–12 seasons; changed the league name from Serie B TIM to Serie Bwin. The League changed again its name in Serie B ConTe.it due to sponsorship reasons.

Serie B is the lowest division in which five clubs have ever played: Torino, Juventus, Milan, Roma and Lazio.

Competition format

Competition 
During the regular season each club plays the others twice (a double round-robin system), once at their home stadium and once at that of their opponents, for 38 games. The games of the first leg (andata) and of the second leg (ritorno) are played in the same order. Teams receive three points for a win and one point for a draw. No points are awarded for a loss.

From the 2006–07 season to 2019–20, the Serie B champion was awarded the Ali della Vittoria (Wings of Victory) cup. The trophy was 63 cm high and weighed 5 kg. Its design represented the wings of Nike, the Greek goddess of victory, holding a cup similar to an Olympic flame. From the 2021–22 season, the Coppa Nexus replaced the previous trophy.

Serie B was composed of 20 teams until the 2002–03 season. It was enlarged to 24 teams for the 2003–04 season due to legal problems relating to Calcio Catania relegation. The league reverted to 22 teams for the 2004–05 season, while Serie A expanded from 18 to 20 teams.

Below is a complete record of how many teams played in each season throughout the league's history;
 18 clubs: 1929–1933
 26 clubs (in two groups): 1933–1934
 32 clubs (in two groups): 1934–1935
 18 clubs: 1935–1936
 16 clubs: 1936–1937
 17 clubs: 1937–1938
 18 clubs: 1938–1943
 60 clubs (in three groups): 1946–1947
 54 clubs (in three groups): 1947–1948
 22 clubs: 1948–1950
 21 clubs: 1950–1951
 22 clubs: 1951–1952
 18 clubs: 1952–1958
 20 clubs: 1958–1967
 21 clubs: 1967–1968
 20 clubs: 1968–2003
 24 clubs: 2003–2004
 22 clubs: 2004–2018
 19 clubs: 2018–2019
 20 clubs: 2019–present

Promotion and relegation 
At the end of the season, three teams are promoted to Serie A and four teams are relegated to Serie C. The top two teams are automatically promoted as is the 3rd-placed team if they are 10 or more points ahead of the 4th-placed team, else there is a playoff tournament that determines the third ascending team.

Since the 2013–14 season, anywhere between two and six teams within a "playoff margin" of 14 points from the 3rd-placed team will enter the playoff tournament. Under the new playoff format, up to three rounds may be required. The final two rounds are two-legged ties while opening round matches (if required) are single legs hosted by the higher-ranked team. If a tie is drawn at the end of regular play (one or two matches, depending on the round), extra time is played. If the two teams are still tied after thirty minutes, the higher classified team advances.

In the relegation zone, the three last-placed teams (18th, 19th and 20th) are automatically demoted to Serie C. If the 16th-placed team is 5 or more points ahead of the 17th-placed team, then the 17th-placed team becomes the 4th and final team to be demoted, otherwise, the conditions for a playoff more commonly called playout exist.

If the playout is necessary, the 16th and 17th-placed teams are paired in a two-legged series with home-field advantage in the 2nd leg going to the 16th-placed team. The team with the higher aggregate score remains in Serie B while the loser becomes the fourth team relegated to Serie C. If an aggregate tie exists at the end of regulation play of the 2nd leg, the 16th-placed team is saved, and the 17th-placed team is demoted, unless the two teams ended the season with equal points, in which case there will be extra-time and a penalty shoot-out if still tied.

Clubs

2022–23 members

Seasons in Serie B
This is the complete list of the 141 clubs that have taken part in the 90 Serie B seasons played from the 1929–30 season until the 2022–23 season. 

The teams in bold compete in Serie B in the 2022–23 season. The teams in italics represent defunct teams. The year in parentheses represents the most recent year of participation at this level. 

 64 seasons: Brescia (2023)
 53 seasons: Verona (2019)
 51 seasons: Modena (2023)
 47 seasons: Bari (2023)
 45 seasons: Palermo (2023)
 40 seasons: Monza (2022)
 39 seasons: Pescara (2021)
 38 seasons: Padova (2019), Venezia (2023) 
 37 seasons: Vicenza (2022)
 36 seasons: Como (2023), Pisa (2023)
 34 seasons: Catania (2015), Genoa (2023), Novara (2018), Reggiana (2021)
 32 seasons: Cesena (2018), Messina (2008)
 31 seasons: Cremonese (2022), Taranto (1993)
 30 seasons: Cagliari (2023), Salernitana (2021)
 29 seasons: Lecce (2022), Parma (2023), Perugia (2023), Ternana (2023)
 28 seasons: Atalanta (2011), Catanzaro (2006)
 27 seasons: Livorno (2020), Spezia (2020)
 26 seasons: Ascoli (2023)
 25 seasons: Foggia (2019), Reggina (2023)
 24 seasons: Cosenza (2023), SPAL (2023)
 22 seasons: Empoli (2021), Triestina (2011)
 21 seasons: Alessandria (2022), Ancona (2010), Sambenedettese (1989), Varese (2015)
 19 seasons: Avellino (2018), Lucchese (1999), Pistoiese (2002)
 18 seasons: Piacenza (2011), Udinese (1995)
 16 seasons: Cittadella (2023), Arezzo (2007), Sampdoria (2012), Treviso (2009)
 15 seasons: Crotone (2022) 
 14 seasons: Legnano (1957), Mantova (2010)
 13 seasons: Pro Patria (1966), Pro Vercelli (2018), Siena (2014)
 12 seasons: Bologna (2015), Fanfulla (1954), Frosinone (2023), Napoli (2007), Torino (2012)
 11 seasons: Lazio (1988), Lecco (1973), Vigevano (1948)
 10 seasons: Chievo (2021),  Marzotto (1961), Prato (1964)
 9 seasons: AlbinoLeffe (2012), Rimini (2009)
 7 seasons: Ravenna (2001), Siracusa (1953)
 6 seasons: Brindisi (1976), Fidelis Andria (1999), Grosseto (2013), Seregno (1935), Viareggio (1948), Virtus Entella (2021)
 5 seasons: Benevento (2023), Campobasso (1987), Carpi (2019), Fiorentina (2004), Juve Stabia (2020), Potenza (1968), Sassuolo (2013), Savona (1967), Trapani (2020)
 4 seasons: Barletta (1991), Casale (1947), Latina (2017), Monfalcone (1933), Pavia (1955), Pro Sesto (1950), Virtus Lanciano (2016)
 3 seasons: Cavese (1984), Derthona (1935), Grion Pola (1935), L'Aquila (1937), Nocerina (2012), Piombino (1954), Pordenone (2022), Sanremese (1940), Savoia (2000)
 2 seasons: Acireale (1995), Biellese (1947), Carrarese (1948), Casertana (1992), Castel di Sangro (1998), Crema (1948), Fiumana (1942), Gallaratese (1948), Gubbio (2012), Licata (1990), Milan (1983), Pro Gorizia (1948), Rieti (1948), Scafatese (1948), Suzzara (1948), Trani (1965), Vogherese (1948)
 1 season: Alba Trastevere (1947), Alzano Virescit (2000), Arsenale Taranto (1947), Bolzano (1948), Centese (1948), Fermana (2000), Forlì (1947), Gallipoli (2010), Juventus (2007), Maceratese (1941), Magenta (1948), Massese (1971), M.A.T.E.R. (1943), Matera (1980), Mestrina (1947), Molinella (1940), Portogruaro (2011), Roma (1952), Sestrese (1947), Sorrento (1972), Südtirol (2023), Vita Nova (1948)

The Serie B–C Alta Italia post-war championship
This championship was organized by geographical criteria with only Northern Italy Serie B and the best Northern Italy Serie C teams taking part. Southern Italy Serie B teams took part to 1945–46 Serie A. For this reason, this championship is not included in the statistics.

Alessandria – Alessandria
Ausonia Spezia – La Spezia
Biellese – Biella
Casale – Casale Monferrato
Cesena – Cesena
Como – Como
Crema – Crema
Cremonese – Cremona
Cuneo – Cuneo
Fanfulla – Lodi
Forlì – Forlì
Gallaratese – Gallarate
Lecco – Lecco
Legnano – Legnano
Mantova – Mantua
Novara – Novara
Padova – Padua
Panigale – Bologna
Parma – Parma
Piacenza – Piacenza
Pro Gorizia – Gorizia
Pro Patria – Busto Arsizio
Pro Sesto – Sesto San Giovanni
Pro Vercelli – Vercelli
Reggiana – Reggio Emilia
Savona – Savona
Seregno – Seregno
Sestrese – Genoa
SPAL – Ferrara
Suzzara – Suzzara
Trento – Trento
Treviso – Treviso
Udinese – Udine
Verona – Verona
Vigevano – Vigevano
Vogherese – Voghera

Champions and promotions

a Not promoted for Serie A reduction.

b Modena and Novara were both awarded champions in 1937–38.

c Six teams were promoted in 2003–04 due to the expansion of Serie A from 18 to 20 teams.

Club performances

Performance by club
Updated as of 2021–22 season

Titles by region
Updated as of 2021–22 season

Titles by city
Updated as of 2021–22 season

Promotions by region
Updated as of 2021–22 season

See also
 Italian football league system
 List of football clubs in Italy
 Sports league attendances

Footnotes

References

External links

  (in Italian)

 
2
Italy
1929 establishments in Italy
Sports leagues established in 1929
Professional sports leagues in Italy